Orvil Township is located in Logan County, Illinois. As of the 2010 census, its population was 1,068 and it contained 483 housing units. Communities found in this township are Hartsburg and Emden.

Geography

Demographics

References

External links
US Census
City-data.com
Illinois State Archives

Townships in Logan County, Illinois
Townships in Illinois